Jacco is a Dutch male given name. It is a form of Jacob or James, only popular since the mid-1960. The spelling Jakko is uncommon. People with the name include:

Jacco
Jacco Arends (born 1991), Dutch badminton player
Jacco Eltingh (born 1970), Dutch tennis player
 (born 1988), Dutch multi-instrumentalist
Jacco Verhaeren (born 1969), Dutch swimming coach
Jacco (singer), real name Jack Mattar, Swedish rapper of the band Labyrint 
Animals:
Jacco Macacco, fighting ape or monkey exhibited in monkey-baiting matches in London in the early 1820s

Jakko
Jakko Jakszyk (born 1958), stage name of Michael Lee Curran, English musician
Jakko Jan Leeuwangh (born 1972), Dutch speed skater

See also
Jacko (disambiguation)
Jaco (disambiguation)

References



Dutch masculine given names